Balboa Park Gardens are cultivated areas of Balboa Park in San Diego, California.

Gardens
There are multiple individual gardens throughout the park, including Alcazar Gardens, the Botanical Building and Reflecting Pool, the Cactus Garden, the Casa del Rey Moro Garden, the Inez Grant Parker Memorial Rose Garden, the Japanese Friendship Garden, the Marston House Garden, Palm Canyon, and Zoro Garden. In addition, the San Diego Zoo includes a noteworthy collection of plants.

Plants
Many of the trees were selected and planted by horticulturalist Kate Sessions, often referred to as "the Mother of Balboa Park".

See also
 Kate Sessions
 List of Parks in San Diego
 Gold Gulch
 List of botanical gardens and arboretums in California

References

Further reading

External links 

 Official San Diego Parks Department -  Balboa Park website
 Balboa Park Foundation garden section

Balboa Park (San Diego)
Parks in San Diego
Landmarks in San Diego
Botanical gardens in California
Gardens in California